The Centre for Historical Research and Documentation on War and Contemporary Society, known by its combined French—Dutch acronym Cegesoma or CegeSoma, is a historical research institute and archive based in Anderlecht, Brussels in Belgium. It focusses on World War II and the contemporary history of Belgium. Since 2016 it has formed part of the Belgian State Archives. Its director is Nico Wouters.

History
The Centre was founded in 1967 as the Centre for Research and Historical Study into the Second World War (Centre de Recherches et d’Etudes historiques de la Seconde Guerre mondiale, CREHSGM; Navorsings- en Studiecentrum van de Geschiedenis van de Tweede Wereldoorlog, NSGWO) . It was created in response to the legal acquittal of Robert Jan Verbelen, a Flemish collaborator, in 1965 as a result of insufficient documentary records. From 1969, the institution began to actively collect publications, interviews and archives relating to the Second World War. Subsequently, it began to expand the scope of its research into World War I and other aspects of contemporary history. In 1997, it was renamed the Centre for Study and Documentary on War and Contemporary Society. It became an autonomous part of the State Archives of Belgium in 2016.

Major projects
Notable projects run by the Centre include:
Belgian War Press: a digital archive of Belgian newspapers published during World War I and II, both "censored" and "clandestine";
Belgium WWII: an educational resource on aspects of Belgian history during World War II.

Research
The Centre has supported a range of monographs, edited volumes and peer-reviewed journals including the Journal of Belgian History. It is a member of the European Network for Contemporary History (EURHISTXX).

See also
 State Archives (Belgium)
 Royal Library of Belgium
 Belgian Federal Science Policy Office
 NIOD Institute for War, Holocaust and Genocide Studies - an equivalent institution in the Netherlands
 Journal of Belgian History

References

External links
 
 

Organizations established in 1969
Research institutes in Belgium
History institutes
Scientific organisations based in Belgium
Archives in Belgium
Military history of Belgium
Science and technology in Belgium
Education in Brussels
Buildings and structures in Brussels